Koyaga senex is a species of moth of the family Noctuidae first described by Arthur Gardiner Butler in 1881. It is found in Japan.

The length of the forewings is 9–12 mm. The forewings are olive brown. The hindwings are brown sprinkled with white.

References

Moths described in 1881
Acontiinae
Moths of Japan